Mixogamasus is a genus of mites in the family Parasitidae.

Species
 Mixogamasus intermedius Juvara-Bals, 1972

References

Parasitidae